Mary Parsons may refer to:
 Mary (Bliss) Parsons, American woman accused of witchcraft
 Mary Almera Parsons, American physician
 Mary Elizabeth Parsons, author of a guide to California wildflowers
 Mary Rosse, in full Mary Parsons, Countess of Rosse, British Irish amateur astronomer, architect, furniture designer, and photographer
 Mary Bridget Parsons, English socialite